School City of Mishawaka is a public school district, headquartered in Mishawaka, Indiana.

The district includes the central part of the city.

History
In 1991 the district began educating children under the care of the Family & Children's Center (FCC), an organization serving disabled children. The FCC sued the school district in 1993 because the district did not want to pay certain fees.

In 2019 Wayne Barker became the superintendent.

Schools
As of February 2022, the district holds jurisdiction over 2 secondary and 7 primary schools. Listed below, they are:
 Secondary
 Mishawaka High School
 John Young Middle School

 Elementary 
 Battell Elementary School
 Beiger  Elementary School
 Emmons Elementary School
 Hums Elementary School
 LaSalle Elementary School
 Liberty Elementary School
 Twin Branch Elementary School

Demographics 
According to the National Center for Education Statistics, School City of Mishawaka served 5,149 students during the 2020–21 academic year. The district employed 370.15 full time equivalent classroom teachers, resulting in a student–teacher ratio of

References

External links
 School City of Mishawaka

Education in St. Joseph County, Indiana
School districts in Indiana
Mishawaka, Indiana